Hemerobaptists (Heb. Tovelei Shaḥarit; "Morning Bathers") were a minor Jewish sect and a subsect of the Essenes. The most important feature of the Hemerobaptists is the common use of baptism. Hemerobaptists would baptize every day, rather than once and for all. Baptism was performed before praying every morning in order to be able to pronounce the Name of God with a clean body. In the Clementine Homilies (ii. 23), John the Baptist and his disciples are mentioned as Hemerobaptists. John's followers may later have been absorbed into the Christian church although some may have gone to the Mandaeans in lower Mesopotamia. The Mandaeans have been associated with the Hemerobaptists on account of both practicing frequent baptism and Mandaeans believing they are disciples of John the Baptist.

Hemerobaptists are part of the minor Jewish sects, including the Bana'im and the Maghāriya.

Historical references 
Hegesippus mentions seven sects of the Jews, one of them was the Hemerobaptists. The sect was also mentioned by Justin Martyr referring to them as "baptizers."

References

Apocalyptic groups
Esoteric schools of thought
Ascetics
Jewish asceticism
Jewish religious movements
Judaism-related controversies
Messianism
Mandaeism
Mandaeans
Israelites
Extinct religious groups

de:Hemerobaptisten